The Meitner–Hupfeld effect, named after Lise Meitner and Hans-Hermann Hupfeld, is an anomalously large scattering of gamma rays by heavy elements. The effect was later explained by a broad theory from which evolved the Standard Model, a theory for explaining the structure of the atomic nucleus. The anomalous gamma-ray behavior was eventually ascribed to electron–positron pair production and annihilation.

Although Professor Meitner was recognized for her work, Dr. Hupfeld is usually ignored, and little or no account of his life exists.

See also
Pair production
Electron-positron annihilation

References

Standard Model
History of physics